The New Democratic Party of Prince Edward Island has held numerous leadership elections in its history.

2002

2006

2009
The party's leadership convention on April 4, 2009, was not competitive, but directly ratified interim leader James Rodd as the party's new permanent leader.

2012
Held October 13, 2012.

2018

Held April 7, 2018. 
Joe Byrne is elected with 57 percent of the vote and 123 votes.

2022

Originally scheduled for November 6, 2021, the leadership vote was held April 23, 2022. The lone candidate, Michelle Neill, was elected by acclamation.

References

New Democratic

New Democratic Party provincial leadership elections